José Gustavo Guerrero (26 June 1876 – 26 October 1958)  was a Salvadoran diplomat and jurist. He was President of the Assembly of the League of Nations from 1929 to 1930. He served as the last president of the Permanent Court of International Justice from  1937 to 1946; he was also the first president of the International Court of Justice ("World Court") from 1946 to 1949, and remained on the Court as a regular judge until his death in 1958.

World War II 
Jose Gustavo Guerrero was a Salvadoran judge who challenged the Nazis during Hitler's invasion on Europe. The distinguished Salvadoran jurist lived in Europe for many years in his career as a diplomat and as presiding judge of the Permanent Court of Justice International, based in The Hague, The Netherlands.

In 1937, during the rise of Nazism in Europe, Doctor Guerrero took over as president, until he was forced to leave in 1940 by the Nazis. Precisely after the fall of Holland, on May 17, 1940, the Nazis tried to take the Palace of the Permanent Court of Justice in The Hague, but there they met the Salvadoran, the only judge who stayed with a group of Dutch officers. When a German general approached, the Presiding Judge told him: "The Court and its staff are inviolable. Only on my body can they enter the palace." For this and others before courage in defense of Universal Law, Dr. Guerrero was twice nominated for the Nobel Peace Prize.
 
Once established in Geneva, Dr. Guerrero was visited by the Consul General of El Salvador in Switzerland, Colonel José Castellanos Contreras, who had fled from Germany, where he served as Consul until El Salvador broke relations with Germany.

Colonel Castellanos had already granted several visas to people of Jewish origin who were persecuted by the Nazis. However, now it was part of a larger project: the handing over of false documents of Salvadoran nationality to people of Jewish origin Castellanos then consulted Dr. Guerrero, who immediately agreed to that plan that saved the lives of thousands of Jews. According to the investigations, Dr. Guerrero would have contributed to writing the text of the document that was then given to them to save their lives.

In 1945 San Francisco, California, a conference was held attended by more than 50 countries and on which the United Nations Organization (UN) was founded.

References

External links
Biography (in Spanish)

Guerrero, Jose Gustavo
Guerrero, Jose Gustavo
20th-century jurists
Permanent Court of International Justice judges
Guerrero, Jose Gustavo
Guerrero, Jose Gustavo
Salvadoran judges of international courts and tribunals
Salvadoran judges of United Nations courts and tribunals
Salvadoran Ministers of Foreign Affairs